Robert Rudolph Balcena (August 1, 1925 – January 5, 1990) was an American professional baseball player. He played as an outfielder in Major League Baseball for the Cincinnati Redlegs during the  season.

Listed at 5' 7", 160 lb., Balcena batted right-handed and threw left-handed. He was born in San Pedro, California.

Balcena became the first player of Filipino ancestry to appear in a major league game. He had a long distinguished Triple-A career with the Seattle Rainiers as a center fielder in the 1950s, and in Seattle is fondly remembered to this day.

He also played from 1952 through 1962 in the Minor Leagues, including stints with the Leones del Caracas and the Industriales de Valencia in the Venezuelan Professional Baseball League.

He batted .284 with 134 home run and 441 runs batted in in 1948 minor league games. In a VPBL two-season career, he posted a .306 average with five homers and 44 RBI in 87 games.

Balcena died in his hometown of San Pedro, California at the age of 64.

External links
Baseball Reference major league statistics
Baseball Reference minor league statistics
Baseball Fever
Venezuelan Professional Baseball League statistics

1925 births
1990 deaths
Águilas de Mexicali players
American baseball players of Filipino descent
American expatriate baseball players in Canada
Baseball players from California
Buffalo Bisons (minor league) players
Dallas Rangers players
Cincinnati Redlegs players
Hawaii Islanders players
Industriales de Valencia players
Kansas City Blues players
Leones del Caracas players
American expatriate baseball players in Venezuela
Major League Baseball left fielders
San Antonio Missions players
Seattle Rainiers players
Toronto Maple Leafs (International League) players
Vancouver Mounties players
Wichita Indians players